Micromonospora oryzae is a bacterium from the genus Micromonospora which has been isolated from the roots of upland rice (Oryza sativa).

References

 

Micromonosporaceae
Bacteria described in 2015